The 1993 Campionati Internazionali di San Marino was a men's tennis tournament played on outdoor clay courts at the Centro Tennis Cassa di Risparmio di Fonte dell'Ovo in the City of San Marino in San Marino and was part of the World Series of the 1993 ATP Tour. It was the fifth edition of the tournament and was held from 9 August until 15 August 1993. First-seeded Thomas Muster won the singles title.

Finals

Singles
 Thomas Muster defeated  Renzo Furlan 7–5, 7–5
 It was Muster's 5th title of the year and the 18th of his career.

Doubles
 Daniel Orsanic /  Olli Rahnasto defeated  Juan Garat /  Roberto Saad 6–4, 1–6, 6–3

See also
 1993 San Marino Open – women's tournament

References

External links
 ITF tournament edition details

Campionati Internazionali di San Marino
San Marino CEPU Open
1993 in Sammarinese sport